Sean William Doherty (born 1980) is a British Anglican priest and academic specialising in Christian ethics. Since June 2019, he has been Principal of Trinity College, Bristol, an evangelical Anglican theological college.

Biography
Doherty studied English literature, theology and ethics at the University of Oxford (BA, MPhil, DPhil), and trained for ordained ministry at Wycliffe Hall, Oxford. His doctoral thesis was titled "Moral theological method in the theological ethics of Martin Luther and Arthur Rich, with particular reference to their economic ethics", and was completed in 2011.

Doherty was ordained in the Church of England as a deacon in 2007 and as a priest in 2008. He served his curacy at St Gabriel's Church, Cricklewood in the Diocese of London from 2007 to 2010. He was additionally a lecturer at St Paul's Theological Centre, Holy Trinity Brompton, between 2008 and 2010. In 2010, he joined St Mellitus College, a Church of England theological college in London, as a tutor and lecturer in Christian ethics. He additionally served the college as Director of Studies from 2014, for his final four years with them. In February 2019, it was announced that he would be leaving St Mellitus College to become the next head of Trinity College, Bristol. He took up the appointment as principal, in succession to Emma Ineson, in June 2019. He has also held permission to officiate in the Diocese of Bristol since 2020. He was an elected member of the General Synod of the Church of England from 2015 to 2019.

Doherty's research interests include economic ethics, sexual ethics, and medical ethics.

Doherty is married to Gaby, and together they have four children. He is same-sex attracted but does not identify as gay. He was a founder of Living Out, a website aimed at people who are "same-sex attracted while remaining committed to a traditional view of Christian sexuality".

Selected works

References

Living people
21st-century Anglican priests
Christian ethicists
Alumni of the University of Oxford
Alumni of Wycliffe Hall, Oxford
Staff of St Mellitus College
Staff of Trinity College, Bristol
Evangelical Anglican clergy
Members of the General Synod of the Church of England
1980 births